The Death Of Tragedy is the eighth album by the hip-hop artist Tragedy Khadafi, released on June 19, 2007.

Track listing
"G-Formation" (produced by Havoc)
"The Truest" (produced by Scram Jones)
"I Am The Streets" (produced by Betrayal)
"Murder By Numbers" (feat. Milk Murder) (produced by GQ Beats)
"Crime Legacy" (produced by Now & Laterz)
"Sole Dead Brothers" (feat. Shinobi & Christ Castro) (produced by Scram Jones)
"Militant Mind State" (produced by Now & Laterz)
"Ryder Musik" (produced by GQ Beats)
"Emaculate G's" (feat. Kool G Rap) (produced by Crack Val)
"Intimate Vision" (produced by GQ Beats)
"Dejavu" (produced by Now & Laterz)
"If You Don't Know" (produced by Now & Laterz)
"25 To Life" (feat. Milk Murder) (produced by GQ Beats)
"Elbouhio Of Death" (produced by GQ Beats)
"Milk Murder (Tribute)" (feat. Milk Murder) (produced by The Alchemist)
"Skit"
"Mind State" (-Bonus track- feat. Killa Sha) (produced by 4th Disciple)

2007 albums
Tragedy Khadafi albums